San Serafino is a Roman Catholic church in Montegranaro, province of Fermo, in the region of Marche, Italy.

History
The church is dedicated to St Seraphin (1540-1604), who was born in Montegranaro. The saint's relics, however, repose in the Church of the Capuchins in Ascoli Piceno, where he died. This small chapel is notable for it wooden altar including paintings of San Lorenzo by Nicola Monti, and the patrons of the shoemakers: Saints Crispino and Crispiniano.

References

Baroque architecture in Marche
Churches in the Province of Fermo